Camponotus empedocles is a large and dark species of carpenter ant with an extensive range in the Afrotropics.

Range
It is native to the Afrotropics and is known to occur in the United Arab Emirates, Yemen, Zimbabwe (type locality) and South Africa.

Description
It is one of the larger, black carpenter ant species of the Afrotropics, with a head width of 3.3 to 3.4 mm. As with other carpenter ants, they have 12 segmented antennae with the antennal insertions distant from the clypeal margin, a rounded pronotum without teeth anteriorly and the petiole entire.

It is uniformly blackish brown with paler legs, and the alitrunk has a continuous, uninterrupted outline. The shiny, uniformly coloured gaster has sparse pubescence, while the duller body is somewhat sculptured. The gula (or medioventral head sclerite) has hairs, but the occiput (back of head) is nearly hairless. The hind tibiae are channeled with a few spiny hairs on the flexor (or inner) surface, with short decumbent (or upward flexing) pubescence evenly covering the whole appendage.

References

External links

empedocles
Insects described in 1920
Hymenoptera of Africa